The Adventist Medical Center College - Iligan, Inc. (also known as  AMC College), formerly the Mindanao Sanitarium and Hospital College, is one of the colleges of the Seventh-day Adventist Church located in Iligan City, Philippines. It is a medical school which focuses on healthcare courses like Bachelor of Science in nursing, medical technology, physical therapy, pharmacy, radiology and nutrition and dietetics.

History
The idea of establishing a college of medical arts was conceived when the administrators of Mindanao Sanitarium and Hospital felt the need for paramedical workers in the hospital. With the shortage of Adventist paramedical workers, particularly in the area of physical therapy, radiology, midwifery and other related fields and with the trends in the tertiary level of education, the MSH Board dreamed to establish a paramedical school in Iligan City. This school would offer courses and training programs in paramedical lines to talented young people of different religious affiliations and regional groups, especially the Seventh-day Adventist youth in Southern Philippines.

Under the Leadership of Joel Y. Dalaguan, Dr. Lorenzo S. Lacson, Jr., and Cholita Suasi, the necessary requirements set by the then Department of Education, Culture and Sports for a college status were accomplished. On February 8, 1994, a temporary permit was granted for the School of Midwifery. A year later, March 10, 1995, the School of Midwifery was granted recognition.

On June 6, 1994, the DECS issued a permit to open first year level of the School of Physical Therapy. Thus, the institution gained the distinction of being the first Seventh-day Adventist College of Medical Arts in the Philippines to offer a course leading to a recognized degree in BS Physical Therapy.

The new college opened on June 13, 1994, in the campus of Mindanao Sanitarium and Hospital with the first batch of 19 midwifery and 88 physical therapy students. The working force was composed of five full-time and six part-time faculty members. The administrators were Joel Y. Dalaguan as president, Dr. Gladden O. Flores as academic dean, Merlyn A. Maquilan as registrar, Dinah W. Almocera and Roselyn A Senas as deans of Physical Therapy and Midwifery, respectively.

The facilities like classrooms, library, laboratories, and offices were in the old elementary school building inside the MSH campus, while a new big building was going to be constructed. The groundbreaking ceremony that was well-attended by the members of the College Board, administrators, faculty, and students was conducted in the old tennis court on October 20, 1994. Thus began a new stage in the series of developments of MSH College of Medical Arts Foundation, Inc.

Academic programs
Medical Courses:
 Bachelor of Science in Nursing
 Bachelor of Science in Radiologic Technology
 Bachelor of Science in Medical Technology
 Bachelor of Science in Physical Therapy
 Bachelor of Science in Nutrition and Dietetics
 Bachelor of Science in Pharmacy
 Graduate in Midwifery

Non - medical Courses:
 Bachelor of Science in Information Technology
 Bachelor of Science in Computer Science
 Bachelor of Science in Secondary Education
 Bachelor of Science in Elementary Education
 Bachelor of Science in Business Administration
Non - degree Course

6 months Health Care Services (January to June)

Senior High School

 Science Technology, Engineering and Mathematics
 Humanities and Social Sciences
 Accountancy and Business Management

Junior High School

 Grade 7-10

Pre-school
 Nursery
 Kinder I and II
Music Center

The music center offers lessons on the following:
 piano
 violin
 saxophone
 guitar
 clarinet
 voice culture lessons

See also

References

Nursing schools in the Philippines
Adventist universities and colleges in the Philippines
Universities and colleges affiliated with the Seventh-day Adventist Church
Universities and colleges in Iligan